This is a list of airlines which have an air operator's certificate issued by the Civil Aviation Authority  of Panama.

{|  class="wikitable sortable" style="border: 0; cellpadding: 2; cellspacing: 3;"
|- valign="middle"
!Airline
!Image
!IATA
!ICAO
!Callsign
!Hub airport(s)
!Founded
!class="unsortable"|Notes
|-
|Aero - Mapiex Aero
|
|
|
|
|Albrook "Marcos A. Gelabert" International AirportEnrique Malek International Airport
|1981
|Business/private charter  
|-
|Air Panama
|
|
|PST
|AIR PANAMA
|Albrook "Marcos A. Gelabert" International Airport
|1980
|
|-
|Arrendamientos Aéreos
|
|
|AAD
|
|Albrook "Marcos A. Gelabert" International Airport
|1999
|Business/private charter
|-
|Cargo Three
|
|C3
|CTW
|THIRD CARGO
|
|2020
|Cargo
|-
|Copa Airlines
|
|CM
|CMP
|COPA
|Tocumen International Airport
|1944
|Flag carrier
|-
|DHL Aero Expreso
|
|D5
|DAE
|YELLOW
|Tocumen International Airport
|1996
|Cargo
|-
|Uniworld Air Cargo
|
|U7
|UCG
|UNIWORLD
|Tocumen International Airport
|2014
|
|-
|Wingo Panama
|
|
|WWP
|WINGO PANAMA
|Tocumen International Airport
|2021
|
|-
|}

 See also 
List of airlines

 
Airlines
Panama
Airlines
Panama